Doleman is a surname. Notable people with the surname include:

Chris Doleman (1961–2020), American football player
Guy Doleman (1923–1996), New Zealand actor
James Doleman (born 1991), New Zealand rugby union referee

See also
 Coleman (surname)
 Dolman (disambiguation)